The St. Lawrence Saints represented St. Lawrence University in ECAC women's ice hockey during the 2015–16 NCAA Division I women's ice hockey season. The Saints upset Princeton in the ECAC Quarterfinals.

Recruiting

2015–16 Saints

Schedule

2015-16 Saints

|-
!colspan=12 style=";"| Regular Season

|-
!colspan=12 style=";"| ECAC Tournament

Awards and honors

 ECAC Team Sportsmanship Award

Amanda Boulier, D, All-ECAC Second Team

References

St. Lawrence
St. Lawrence Saints women's ice hockey seasons
St. Lawrence Saints women's ice hockey season
St. Lawrence Saints women's ice hockey season